8 Ball Aitken (born 9 June 1981) is an Australian singer, songwriter, and guitarist. 8 Ball plays blues, swamp-blues, swamp-rock, alternative country, and Americana music. He is notable for his fusion of Australian blues and country music.

Aitken is the founder of the Mt Coot-tha Songwriters Festival.

History
At the 2008 Q Song Awards, Aitken won Blues and Roots Song of the Year for "Yellow Moon". At the same awards in 2009, "Outback Booty Call" won Country Song of the Year.

Aitken's song "Cowboy Movie" was nominated for the Australian Blues & Roots Song of the Year at the APRA Music Awards of 2009.

Aitken third studio album Rebel with a Cause was produced by Garth Porter. The album produced two top 10 country hits, "Cyclone Country" & "Hands on Top of the Wheel".

In 2013, Aitken had a one song in the Australian Country Music Radio Charts with song "She's Going to Mexico, I'm Going to Jail".

Discography

Studio albums

Compilations albums

Awards and nominations

APRA Awards
The APRA Awards are held in Australia and New Zealand by the Australasian Performing Right Association to recognise songwriting skills, sales and airplay performance by its members annually. Aitken has been nominated for one award.

! 
|-
! scope="row"| 2009
| "Cowboy Movie"
| Australian Blues & Roots Song of the Year
| 
|
|-
! scope="row"| 2019 
| "High Water" (8 Ball Aitken / Guthrie Kennard)
| Song of the Year
| 
| 
|-

Q Song Awards
The Queensland Music Awards (previously known as Q Song Awards) are annual awards celebrating Queensland, Australia's brightest emerging artists and established legends. They commenced in 2006.

 (wins only)
|-
| 2008
| "Yellow Moon"
| Blues and Roots Song of the Year 
| 
|-
| 2009
| "Outback Booty Call"
| Country Song of the Year 
| 
|-

References

 

Australian blues singers
Australian country singers
Living people
1981 births
21st-century Australian male singers